The 2003 Boise State Broncos football team represented Boise State University in the 2003 NCAA Division I-A football season. Boise State competed as a member of the Western Athletic Conference (WAC), and played their home games at Bronco Stadium in Boise, Idaho. The Broncos were led by third-year head coach Dan Hawkins. The Broncos finished the season 13–1 and 8–0 in conference to win their second consecutive WAC title and played in the Fort Worth Bowl, where they defeated TCU, 34–31.

Schedule

References

Boise State
Boise State Broncos football seasons
Western Athletic Conference football champion seasons
Armed Forces Bowl champion seasons
Boise State Broncos football